Frank Whitney may refer to:

Frank DeArmon Whitney (born 1959), United States federal judge
Frank Whitney (baseball) (1856–1943), American Major League Baseball player